zswap is a Linux kernel feature that provides a compressed write-back cache for swapped pages, as a form of virtual memory compression. Instead of moving memory pages to a swap device when they are to be swapped out, zswap performs their compression and then stores them into a memory pool dynamically allocated in the system RAM. Later writeback to the actual swap device is deferred or even completely avoided, resulting in a significantly reduced I/O for Linux systems that require swapping; the tradeoff is the need for additional CPU cycles to perform the compression.

As a result of reduced I/O, zswap offers advantages to various devices that use flash-based storage, including embedded devices, netbooks and similar low-end hardware devices, as well as to other devices that use solid-state drives (SSDs) for storage. Flash memory has a limited lifespan due to its nature, so avoiding it to be used for providing swap space prevents it from wearing out quickly.

Internals
zswap is integrated into the rest of Linux kernel's virtual memory subsystem using the API provided by frontswap, which is a mechanism of the Linux kernel that abstracts various types of storage that can be used as swap space. As a result, zswap operates as a backend driver for frontswap by providing what is internally visible as a pseudo-RAM device. In other words, the frontswap API makes zswap capable of intercepting memory pages while they are being swapped out, and capable of intercepting page faults for the already swapped pages; the access to those two paths allows zswap to act as a compressed write-back cache for swapped pages.

Internally, zswap uses compression modules provided by the Linux kernel's crypto API, which makes it possible, for example, to offload the compression tasks from the main CPU using any of the hardware compression accelerators supported by the Linux kernel. The selection of the desired compression module can be performed dynamically at the boot time through the value of kernel boot parameter ; if not specified, it selects the Lempel–Ziv–Oberhumer (LZO) compression. As of version 3.13 of the Linux kernel, zswap also needs to be explicitly enabled by specifying value  for the kernel boot parameter .

The maximum size of the memory pool used by zswap is configurable through the  parameter , which specifies the maximum percentage of total system RAM that can be occupied by the pool. The memory pool is not preallocated to its configured maximum size, and instead grows and shrinks as required. When the configured maximum pool size is reached as the result of performed swapping, or when growing the pool is impossible due to an out-of-memory condition, swapped pages are evicted from the memory pool to a swap device on the least recently used (LRU) basis. This approach makes zswap a true swap cache, as the oldest cached pages are evicted to a swap device once the cache is full, making room for newer swapped pages to be compressed and cached.

zbud is a special-purpose memory allocator used internally by zswap for storing compressed pages, implemented as a rewrite of the zbud allocator used by the Oracle's zcache, which is another virtual memory compression implementation for the Linux kernel. Internally, zbud works by storing up to two compressed pages ("buddies", hence the allocator name) per physical memory page, which brings both advantages due to easy coalescing and reusing of freed space, and disadvantages due to possible lower memory utilization. However, as a result of its design, zbud cannot allocate more memory space than it would be originally occupied by the uncompressed pages.

History
Both zswap and zbud were created by Seth Jennings. The first public announcement was in December 2012, and the development continued until May 2013 at which point the codebase reached its maturity although still having the status of an experimental kernel feature.

zswap (together with zbud) was merged into the Linux kernel mainline in kernel version 3.11, which was released on September 2, 2013.

Since version 3.15 of the Linux kernel, which was released on June 8, 2014, zswap properly supports multiple swap devices.

Alternatives
One of the alternatives to zswap is zram, which provides a similar but still different "swap compressed pages to RAM" mechanism to the Linux kernel.

The main difference is that zram provides a compressed block device using RAM for storing data, which acts as a regular and separate swap device.

In comparison, zswap acts as a RAM-based cache for swap devices. Though, as a result of its design, at least one already existing swap device is required for zswap to be used.

See also

 Cache (computing)
 Linux swap
 Swap partitions on SSDs

References

Free software programmed in C
Linux kernel features
Memory management
Virtual memory